The 2004–05 Maltese FA Trophy was the 67th season since its establishment. The competition started on 6 November 2004 and ended on 20 May 2005 with the final, which Birkirkara won 2-1 against Msida St. Joseph.

First round

|colspan="3" style="background:#fcc;"|6 November 2004

|-
|colspan="3" style="background:#fcc;"|7 November 2004

|-
|colspan="3" style="background:#fcc;"|13 November 2004

|}

Second round

|colspan="3" style="background:#fcc;"|26 December 2004

|-
|colspan="3" style="background:#fcc;"|27 December 2004

|}

Quarter-finals

|colspan="3" style="background:#fcc;"|2 April 2005

|-
|colspan="3" style="background:#fcc;"|3 April 2005

|}

Semi-finals

Final

References

External links
 RSSSF page

Malta
Maltese FA Trophy seasons
Cup